Doctors of the Dark Side is a documentary about the role of physicians and psychologists in the torture of prisoners. The movie tells the story of four detainees, and how healthcare professionals working for the United States Army and the Central Intelligence Agency implemented enhanced interrogation techniques, and covered up signs of torture at the Guantanamo Bay Detention Camp and Abu Ghraib Prison. Interviews with medical, legal and intelligence experts and evidence from declassified government memos document how the torture of detainees could not continue without the assistance of doctors.

References

American documentary films
Documentary films about human rights
Medical ethics
2011 films
2011 documentary films
Documentary films about health care
Torture
Medical malpractice
2010s English-language films
2010s American films